Bavayia is a genus of lizards in the family Diplodactylidae. Species in the genus Bavayia are also known commonly as New Caledonian geckos or bavayias. The genus is native to the remote New Caledonia and Loyalty Islands.  The 41 species are moderately small to medium-sized geckos, and are distinguished from other genera by their tail length and the shape of their digits.

Etymology
The generic name, Bavayia, is in honor of Arthur Bavay, a French pharmacist and herpetologist.

Description
All species of Bavayia have elongated digits, with each claw on the edge of each seta. They are fairly drab in coloration.

Behavior
Bavayia  species are nocturnal, and spend the daylight hours hiding under bark or rocks, or in tree holes.

Species
These 41 described species are recognized as being valid:
Bavayia ashleyi 
Bavayia astrongatti 
Bavayia borealis 
Bavayia boulinda 
Bavayia caillou 
Bavayia campestris 
Bavayia centralis 
Bavayia cocoensis 
Bavayia crassicollis  – strand bavayia
Bavayia cyclura  – Günther's New Caledonian gecko
Bavayia endemia 
Bavayia exsuccida  – Sclerophyll bavayia
Bavayia geitaina  – gracile bavayia
Bavayia goroensis 
Bavayia insularis 
Bavayia jourdani 
Bavayia kanaky 
Bavayia koniambo 
Bavayia kopeto 
Bavayia kunyie 
Bavayia lepredourensis 
Bavayia loyaltiensis 
Bavayia mandjeliensis 
Bavayia menazi 
Bavayia montana  – mountain New Caledonian gecko
Bavayia nehoueensis 
Bavayia nubila 
Bavayia occidentalis 
Bavayia ornata  – ornate bavayia
Bavayia periclitata 
Bavayia pulchella  – pretty bavayia
Bavayia renevierorum 
Bavayia rhizophora 
Bavayia robusta  – robust forest bavayia
Bavayia sauvagii  – Sauvage's New Caledonian gecko
Bavayia septuiclavis  – Sadlier's New Caledonian gecko
Bavayia stephenparki 
Bavayia tanleensis 
Bavayia tchingou 
Bavayia ultramaficola 
Bavayia whitakeri 

Nota bene: A binomial authority in parentheses indicates that the species was originally described in a genus other than Bavayia.

Taxonomy
The species formerly known as Bavayia madjo is now known as Paniegekko madjo.

The species formerly known as Bavayia validiclavis is now known as Dierogekko validiclavis.

References

Further reading
Roux J (1913). "Les Reptiles de la Nouvelle-Calédonie et des îles Loyalty." pp. 80–146. In: Sarasin F, Roux J (1913). Nova Caledonia: Forschungen in Neu-Caledonien und auf den Loyalty Inseln: Recherches scientifiques en Nouvelle Calédonie et aux Iles Loyalty. A. Zoologie. Vol. I., L. 2. Wiesbaden: C.W. Kreidels Verlag. 449 pp. (Bavayia, new genus, pp. 85–87). (in French).

External links

 
Geckos of New Caledonia
Lizard genera
Taxa named by Jean Roux